Tropical Storm Debbie of the 1965 Atlantic hurricane season broke the daily rainfall record in Mobile, Alabama, despite dissipating offshore. It developed on September 24 in the western Caribbean Sea, and moved northwestward for several days without intensifying. On September 27, Debbie turned toward the northeast in the Gulf of Mexico, and the next day briefly attained tropical storm status. However, the intrusion of cooler air imparted weakening, and the storm dissipated on September 30 just off the east coast of Louisiana. It initially threatened areas of Louisiana that sustained significant damage from Hurricane Betsy in early September, although Debbie only caused light rainfall and some flooding in the state. In southern Alabama, the storm dropped  of rainfall, which resulted in significant flooding of roads and cars. Damage totaled $25 million in the Mobile, Alabama area, although there was little damage elsewhere.

Meteorological history

A low-pressure area developed into a weak tropical depression on September 24 off the north coast of Honduras in the western Caribbean Sea. It was initially disorganized, without a well-developed circulation. On September 25, while still a tropical depression, the system was named Debbie. Without intensifying further, the depression crossed the northeastern Yucatán Peninsula on September 26. The next day, the depression turned toward the north in the central Gulf of Mexico before beginning a northeast motion. On September 28, Debbie intensified into a tropical storm, attaining peak winds of 50 mph (85 km/h). This occurred after the storm developed two distinct spiral rainbands.

As Debbie approached the northern Gulf Coast, it failed to intensify, despite warm sea surface temperatures, abundant moisture, and an anticyclone aloft. In addition, the storm never developed good outflow, partially due to stable air related to Tropical Storm Hazel in the eastern Pacific Ocean. After maintaining peak winds for about 12 hours, Debbie weakened due to cooler, drier air, deteriorating to a tropical depression on September 29. That day, it turned to the northwest, passing just east of the Mississippi Delta. On September 30, the circulation of Debbie dissipated just offshore Mississippi. Its remnants made landfall, accelerated northeastward, and were eventually absorbed by an extratropical cyclone.

Impact

The precursor to Debbie produced heavy rainfall across the western Caribbean Sea. Swan Island off the north coast of Honduras reported  in a 24-hour period. Grand Cayman reported light rains for two days. The government of Cuba advised residents to restrict boating activities around the country. Similarly, the Weather Bureau issued a small craft warning for the Dry Tortugas and for the Florida Keys through Key Largo.

Before Debbie dissipated, local Weather Bureau offices issued a gale warning and a hurricane watch from the mouth of the Mississippi River to Cedar Key, Florida. Small boat owners throughout the region were advised to remain at port. The threat of the storm prompted the evacuation of oil platforms, as well as thousands of residents in low-lying areas of St. Bernard Parish, Louisiana. Along the northern Gulf Coast, no gale force winds were reported inland, although oil rigs and ships off the southeast Louisiana coast reported such winds. The tides resulted in flooding along highways in southeastern Louisiana, closing several roads. The storm affected areas that were severely damaged by Hurricane Betsy earlier in September.

Of the total,  fell in 15 hours, which broke the daily rainfall record in the city. Hundreds of cars were flooded, and more than 200 people had to leave their inundated homes. Damage in the city was estimated at $25 million, which was the only significant damage from the storm. Rainfall extended from Louisiana to the east coast of Florida, and as far north as North Carolina.

See also

Other storms of the same name

References

Debbie (1965)
Debbie (1965)